Ataraxia is an Italian neoclassical dark wave band founded in 1985. Fronted by vocalist Francesca Nicoli, it combines modern technology with archaic instrumentation. Its lyrical themes are frequently drawn from nature and ancient cultures.

History
The band was founded by Francesca Nicoli and Michele Urbano in November 1985. In the first five years there were many musicians in the band, until finally Francesca Nicoli, Vittorio Vandelli, and Giovanni Pagliari became the basic line-up until today.

Style and lyrical themes
The band combine modern technology with archaic instrumentation over various media. The members have said they have dedicated their lives to art, to explore the nobleness of centuries in many possible ways (music, poetry, theatre, and photography). They define themselves as "craftsmen of the sound" because they create an unusual mix of sacred and profane, atmospheric and experimental, contemporary and early music, using acoustic and electric instruments as well, always with such language which fits best to the actual work.

The word ataraxia is taken from Epicurean philosophy and means "equanimity", "calmness" and "unflappability". Ataraxia place themselves in a spiritual tradition from Greco-Roman and Celtic cultures. Nicoli has described the production process as "medianic" and associated it with the cult of Dionysus, where "the musician was possessed by the God of Nature who spoke through him/her". Regarding the band's pagan themes, Nicoli associates the word paganism with the countryside, and maintains that life in the countryside creates a connection to the rhythm of nature. In that sense, she considers Atarax a pagan band: "I feel that I'm in a communion with that which surrounds me".

Members

Current
Francesca Nicoli - vocal, flute, recorder (since 1985)
Vittorio Vandelli - guitars, percussion, vocal (since 1986)
Giovanni Pagliari - keys, vocal (since 1990)
Riccardo Spaggiari - percussion, vocal (since 2003)

Past
Michele Urbano - bass (1985 – 1992)
Donato - guitar

Contributors
Lorenzo Busi - actor and dancer (1991 – 2003)
Livio Bedeschi - photographer and graphic designer
Nicolas Ramain - speech and guitar in the song "Strange Lights"
Francesco Banchini - clarinet, flute, percussion, vocal (1999 – 2003)

Releases

Full-length Albums
Prophetia (1990)
Nosce te ipsum (1991)
Arazzi (1993)
Sub ignissima luna (1993)
Simphonia sine nomine (1994)
Ad perpetuam rei memoriam (1994)
Il fantasma dell'opera (1995)
La malédiction d'ondine (1995)
The Moon Sang on the April Chair (1995)
Il fantasma dell'opera (1996)
Concerto N.6: A baroque plaisanterie (1996)
Historiae (1998)
Lost Atlantis (1999)
Suenos (2001)
Mon seul désir (2002)
Saphir (2004)
Paris spleen (2006) (its cover features the main entrance of Cabaret de L'Enfer )
Kremastra nera (2007)
Llyr (2010)
Spasms (2013)
Wind at Mount Elo (2014)
Ena (2015)
Deep Blue Firmament (2016)
Synchronicity Embraced (2018)
Quasar (2020)
Pomegranate – The Chant Of The Elementals (2022)

Live albums
Os cavaleiros do templo (VHS + CD) (1998)
Strange Lights (2009)

Others
Orlando (maxi CD) (1998)
Des paroles blanches (maxi CD) (2003)
Arcana eco (book + CD) (2005)

Videos
Nosce te ipsum (1991)
Would the Winged Light Climb? (1995)
Concerto No. 6. - A baroque plaisanterie (1997)
Os cavaleiros do tempolo (1998, 2009)
Spirito ancestrale (2002)

References

Notes

Sources

External links

 Official Website
 
 
 Gor info page at website of its label Prikosvenie
 interview with the band (in French)

Italian musical groups
Prikosnovénie artists
Musical groups established in 1985
1985 establishments in Italy
Italian dark wave musical groups
Modern pagan musical groups
Modern paganism in Italy